Sekolah Menengah Sains Rembau (abbreviated SEMESRA) is a co-educational secondary school situated in the district of Rembau and among fully residential schools (Sekolah Berasrama Penuh) in the state of Negeri Sembilan, Malaysia. Established in 2009, the school is widely known as SEMESRA.

In the recent PMR examination (2013), the school managed to produce 108 straight A's students with GPS 1.0535 to become the third best school in Negeri Sembilan.

On 30 October 2014, SEMESRA was awarded with the Sekolah Berprestasi Tinggi or High Performance School title, a title awarded to schools in Malaysia that have met stringent criteria including academic achievement, strength of alumni, international recognition, network and linkages.

History
Sekolah Menengah Sains Rembau, Negeri Sembilan (SEMESRA) was established on 1 October 2009. On 5 January 2010, the first principal, Dato' Haji Azam bin Md Atan, registered for duty as the Super Principal of SEMESRA. He was assisted by the Vice Principals; Tn Hj Baharudin Husin (Academics), Tn Hj Azman Awang (Student Affairs), and Pn Roslina Aziz (Co-curriculum). The institution's first intake of students was on 16 November 2009 when 130 Form One students registered.

Now, the school caters to more than 800 students. As one of the elite residential schools in Malaysia, one of SEMESRA's main purposes is to produce future leaders with first-class mind and multi-talented skills. To ensure that this mission is achieved, there are more than 50 well-experienced and skilful teachers teaching in SEMESRA.

Being a green horn among the well-established schools in Malaysia has not stopped SEMESRA from achieving success in both the curricular and co-curricular fields. Each success has been the result of co-operation, teamwork, effort and perseverance from the teachers and students.

After Dato' Haji Azam officially retired in April 2011, the successor, Puan Norzila Idris, took realm as the new principal. She was the perfect fit to continue the task of thrusting SEMESRA into a greater level, which was evident by the many changes that had been brought forth upon her taking office.

Student selection is divided into two. For entry into Form One, selection is based on the achievement in the Ujian Pencapaian Sekolah Rendah (UPSR). For entry into Form Four, the students are selected based on their excellent results in the Penilaian Menengah Rendah (PMR) nationwide. These two entry selections also take the co-curricular factors into consideration. The selection process is made by the Ministry of Education, as per all Malaysian public residential schools (SBP).

Intakes for Form One may cater for over 150 boys and girls, while new intakes of Form Four students may be around 50 to 60 boys and girls (at most). Enrollment for each academic year is divided into three intakes.

In the year 2011, SEMESRA students sat for their first public examinations, with Extrovert 0913 batch sat for PMR while Valedictorian 1011 batch sat for SPM. The first SPM result sat by Valedictorian 1011 managed to place SEMESRA in the 7th spot nationwide, with a remarkable GPS of 1.3006 among other elite schools in the SPM 2011 ranking.

In the year 2012, with a GPS of 1.0408, 119 out of 150 students managed to get straight A's in the PMR 2011 examinations, allowing SEMESRA to be ranked in the 9th spot nationwide and became the second best school in Negeri Sembilan that year.

Due to its outstanding performance in many aspects, SEMESRA was awarded Sekolah Berprestasi Tinggi award on 30 October 2014.

Location
The new campus is located opposite to a housing area, Taman Desa Permai Kundur, some 7 km from the North-South Expressway (Pedas-Linggi exit), 12 km from the Rembau town, and 38 km from the town of Seremban.

Activities

Co-Curriculum
Apart from results in academic, the school also actively participates in co-curricular activities. The school teams excel regularly in cadets, chess, public speaking, choral speaking, choir, drama and debates, with records in winning the district- and states-level competitions.

Some of the sports teams also managed to record considerable feats, particularly in athletics, and rugby.

Other popular sports in SEMESRA are archery, football, netball, basketball, hockey, tennis, petanque, cricket, badminton, futsal and volleyball. Some of these teams have names on their own; such as Ryders/Storm (Basketball), Lycans (Rugby) and Valiant (Netball).

Internationalisation
The school’s internationalisation initiative is one of the school's main annual agenda, aimed to expose the students beyond the campus ground, particularly to the different learning environment. Through this initiative, SEMESRA forged ties and agreements with various foreign educational institutions, apart from going for humanitarian missions.

In 2011, the school’s delegation flew to Lombok, Indonesia and visited several educational institutions, whereby the delegation signed MoU with them. In the same year, some students also went to Cambodia and Vietnam for a humanitarian mission.

The following year, SEMESRA paid visits to several schools in Padang, Indonesia. This year (2014), the school delegates went to visit Ho Chi Minh City in Vietnam.

Apart from that, SEMESRA students also participate in student-exchange programmes, Japan-East Asia Network of Exchange for Students and Youths (JENESYS) which is held every year. This opportunity is opened to students who take Japanese as their third language, allowing them to be exposed to the environment in Japan.

Symbols
The motto is Tekun Bersatu Berjaya Terbilang while the school official colours are white, black and maroon. The school flag is a white flag with four-coloured stripes (Red, Yellow, Green, Blue) representing the four houses which accommodate the students, with the school emblem placed at the centre of the flag. The main symbol commonly associated to the school is the Islamic geometry motives, which are seen in the school emblem, school building architectures, and the official sarongs and sampings (worn by students every Friday).

Houses
There are two hostel blocks which houses the boys and girls each. Each hostel is supervised by teacher-wardens who live in the warden’s unit in the same building. To look after the discipline and the well being of the students in the hostels, the warden is helped by prefects appointed from the more senior students.

Each floor of the hostel is further divided into "Houses" named after the four Undang Luak of Negeri Sembilan, each indicated by a colour: Kelana Petra (Blue), Akhirul Zaman (Red), Johan Pahlawan (Green) and Lela Maharaja (Yellow). The house system promotes the spirit of co-operation among boys and girls in the same house and provides competition in games, athletics, cleanliness (3K), academics and debates. All these account for the scores obtained by each house, of which the house with the highest score will be awarded as the best house of the year.

School Anthem
Malay lyrics
Di sini bermula perjalanan kita
Menjana insan berpengetahuan
Ke arah pencapaian bertaraf dunia
Melahirkan warga yang terbilang

Menjana pendidikan minda kelas pertama
Ke arah kemajuan Negara
Tekun bersatu berjaya dan terbilang
Melahirkan insan yang cemerlang

Kami warga SEMESRA
Sentiasa bersemangat waja
SEMESRA dihatiku sentiasa
Lambang kebanggaan semua

Song composed by: Mr. Long Chea Yang 
Lyrics by: Mdm. Nor Azliza Zakaria & Mdm. Riyanti Abdullah Sani

Principals
 2009–2011: Dato' Haji Azam Md Atan
 2011–2017: Hjh Norzila Idris
 2018–present: Datin Zainah binti Ahmad Sisman

References

External links

 
 Official alumni portal

2009 establishments in Malaysia
Educational institutions established in 2009
Co-educational boarding schools